Padma Shri Award, India's fourth highest civilian honours – Winners, 1970–1979:

Recipients

References

Explanatory notes 

Non-citizen recipients

External links 
 
 

Recipients of the Padma Shri
Lists of Indian award winners
1970s in India
1970s-related lists